The First Street station was a local station on the demolished IRT Second Avenue Line in Manhattan, New York City, located at the intersection of First Street and First Avenue. It had two levels. The lower level had two tracks and two side platforms and the upper level had one track that served express trains. The station opened on March 1, 1880, and closed on June 13, 1942.

References

External links

IRT Second Avenue Line stations
Railway stations in the United States opened in 1880
1880 establishments in New York (state)
Railway stations closed in 1942
Former elevated and subway stations in Manhattan